John Ruggles Case (March 31, 1889 – January 20, 1975) was an American track and field athlete who competed in the 1912 Summer Olympics. He was born in Evanston, Illinois and died in Oceanside, California. In 1912 he finished fourth in the 110 metre hurdles competition.

References

External links

1889 births
1975 deaths
American male hurdlers
Olympic track and field athletes of the United States
Athletes (track and field) at the 1912 Summer Olympics